Jock Madden (born 7 March 2000) is a professional rugby league footballer who plays as a  or  for the Brisbane Broncos in the NRL (National Rugby League).

He previously played for the Wests Tigers in the NRL.

Background 
Madden played his junior rugby league for the Scone Thoroughbreds. He is a great-nephew of Australian representative Don Adams.

In 2018, Madden represented and Captained the Australian Schoolboys while attending All Saints College, Maitland.

Career

2021 
Madden made his debut in round 10 of the 2021 NRL season for the Wests Tigers against the Newcastle Knights.

2022
Madden played a total of 14 games for the Wests Tigers in the 2022 NRL season as the club claimed the Wooden Spoon for the first time. At the end of the season, he signed for Brisbane.

References

External links
Wests Tigers profile
Get to know Jock Madden!

2000 births
Australian rugby league players
Rugby league halfbacks
Wests Tigers players
Western Suburbs Magpies NSW Cup players
Living people